Ngoni Methukhela Makusha (born 26 June 1994) is a Zimbabwean sprinter. He finished sixth in the 100 metres at the 2018 African Championships. In addition, he represented his country at the 2019 World Relays.He is the 2018 Southern region Championships champion in the 100m and 200m 
He is a bronze medalist in the 4×100m Relay held in Mauritius 2022

International competitions

Personal bests
Outdoor
100 metres – 10.17 (+0.3 m/s, Réduit 2018)
200 metres – 20.49 (+1.2 m/s, Pretoria 2019)

References

Zimbabwean male sprinters
1994 births
Living people
Athletes (track and field) at the 2019 African Games
African Games competitors for Zimbabwe
Athletes (track and field) at the 2020 Summer Olympics
Olympic athletes of Zimbabwe
Olympic male sprinters